Phulwari Assembly constituency is one of 243 constituencies of legislative assembly of Bihar. It comes under Pataliputra Lok Sabha constituency along with other assembly constituencies viz. Danapur, Maner, Masaurhi, Paliganj and Bikram.  It is reserved for scheduled castes.

Overview
Phulwari comprises CD Blocks Phulwari Sharif & Punpun.

Members of Legislative Assembly

Election results

2020

2015

2010

References

External links
 

Assembly constituencies in Patna district
Politics of Patna district
Assembly constituencies of Bihar